Lake Bucura is a glacier cirque lake, situated in the Retezat Mountains, in Romania.

It is the largest glacier lake in Romania, having an area of over 105,000 square metres.  It is 550 m in length, 160 m in width on average, and 225 m maximum width, for a perimeter of 1,390 m. The maximum depth is 15.5 m, and the volume 625,000 m³.

See also
Lakes of Romania

Notes

External links

Glacial lakes of Romania
Lakes of the Carpathians